Relient K  is an American rock band formed in 1998 in Canton, Ohio, by Matt Thiessen, Matt Hoopes, and Brian Pittman during the band members' third year in high school and their time at Malone University. The band is named after guitarist Hoopes' automobile, a Plymouth Reliant K car, with the spelling intentionally altered to avoid trademark infringement over the Reliant name. The group is known for its Christian rock, alternative Christian rock, and contemporary Christian music.

The group is associated with the contemporary Christian music culture, most notably the Christian rock and punk scene. The group has also performed alongside secular artists. The band has reached critical success with mainstream pop punk and alternative rock. The band's sound incorporates piano and acoustic elements. Since its formation, Relient K has released nine studio albums, seven EPs, two Christmas albums, and one collection of rarities. The band has received numerous awards including a Grammy Award nomination in 2004 for Best Rock Gospel Album and two Dove Awards.

Relient K has found commercial success with their studio albums, three of which peaked in the top 15 of the U.S. Billboard 200 chart: 2004's Mmhmm, which debuted at No. 15; 2007's Five Score and Seven Years Ago, their fifth and most successful album, which debuted at No. 6; and 2009's Forget and Not Slow Down, which debuted at No. 15. The band has sold over 2 million records, with three albums being given gold certification by the RIAA. The band is also highly successful throughout the Christian albums and contemporary Christian music charts. On October 4, 2011 the band released a cover album Is for Karaoke. On July 2, 2013, the band's seventh full-length album, Collapsible Lung, was released. On July 22, 2016, the band's eighth full-length album, Air for Free, was released. On April 24, 2020, they released Relient K: Live that includes 15 tracks that were only previously available on vinyl and were recorded at shows in 2009 and 2016.

History

All Work and No Play and Relient K (1998–2000) 

After Relient K was founded by Matt Thiessen, Matt Hoopes and Brian Pittman in 1998, Todd Frascone joined for a short time in 1998 as a drummer. However, Frascone left the band after recording the demo All Work & No Play. The demo was recorded by Mark Lee Townsend, the former live guitar player for dc Talk. Townsend had met the band members because his daughter, Danielle, was friends with the band. Danielle eventually married guitarist Matt Hoopes.

All Work & No Play caught the attention of dc Talk's Toby McKeehan (tobyMac), who later signed the band to his label, Gotee Records. With the label Relient K released its debut EP, 2000 A.D.D. in 2000, with Stephen Cushman on drums. Soon after, the band released Relient K, the group's first full-length CD. Although it was similar to Christian rock and featured lyrics with a wide range of pop-culture references. Cushman left later that year to join the Christian metal band Narcissus. Brett Schoneman of Christian rock band Philmore filled in temporarily, followed by Jared Byers, drummer of the Christian rock band Bleach, until Dave Douglas joined in December 2000.

In an interview, Matt Thiessen said that when the band started, he was the only one who sang, but he knew Matt Hoopes could sing as well. Hoopes was reluctant, but Thiessen said he "got it out of him". As a result, Hoopes became the primary back-up vocalist.

The Anatomy of the Tongue in Cheek (2001–2002) 

The band released its second album, The Anatomy of the Tongue in Cheek, in 2001. Though there were still plenty of pop-culture references on this album, it contained many more softer songs and slightly lighter guitars. The band would continue chords through tracks in order to fluidly transition in between songs, a trend that continued on the group's later albums.

Anatomy landed them in the Christian rock limelight, and Relient K was offered a clothing deal with Abercrombie & Fitch in 2001. Gotee, the band's label, accepted the offer on Relient K's behalf; Pittman recalls, "The choice was never really given to us. The label made the choice." After significant pressure from conservative Christian organizations such as Focus on the Family, Gotee backed out of the contract.

Relient K was then asked to do a rendition of the popular VeggieTales song "The Pirates Who Don't Do Anything" for the 2002 feature length VeggieTales movie Jonah: A VeggieTales Movie. The song was released on three different albums, two in single form. The first version also included Relient K's "Breakdown" being sung by Larry the Cucumber. There was also a promotional version which included the original version of "Breakdown". A cut-down version (missing the bridge) was included on the Christian rock compilation Veggie Rocks!. This song mixes the sounds of The Anatomy of the Tongue in Cheek, and the band's third album, Two Lefts Don't Make a Right...but Three Do.

Two Lefts Don't Make a Right...but Three Do (2003) 

In 2003, Relient K released Two Lefts Don't Make a Right...but Three Do. The album had multiple covers of different colors, each depicting a vehicle in some kind of wreck. As pop-culture references became less specific, sound and vocals became far more defined. Two Lefts Don't Make a Right...but Three Do (often called Two Lefts by fans) combined the soft, meaningful songs of The Anatomy of the Tongue in Cheek and threw in fast-paced songs with deep lyrics. It was nominated for a Grammy in the category of "Best Rock Gospel Album" and won the Dove Award for "Modern Rock Album of the Year" in 2004.

During this time, Relient K also released a limited edition red vinyl EP entitled The Vinyl Countdown, only released in one printing. The EP included two versions of the song, "Five Iron Frenzy is Either Dead or Dying."  The album was dedicated to Jesse Alkire, contest winner and friend of Matthew Thiessen, who inspired the song "The Vinyl Countdown."

Since Two Lefts Don't Make a Right...but Three Do was released in March 2003, Relient K released a bonus disc for Christmas, entitled Deck the Halls, Bruise Your Hand. The album was packaged with Two Lefts Don't Make a Right...but Three Do from November 2003 to December 2003.

Mmhmm (2004–2006) 

The group released its fourth album, Mmhmm, in late 2004.  Pop-culture references were even less specific than on the band's third album, if present at all. The album was significantly more on the serious side with very few of the silly songs the band was known for. The album had the band experimenting with its sound a bit more, which included incorporating piano, hardcore punk and some pop music. In July 2005, the album was certified gold for shipping over 500,000 copies. It is reported that it has sold approximately 796,000 copies. Driven by newfound recognition from Mmhmm, Two Lefts Don't Make a Right...but Three Do was also certified gold in spring 2005. Also, it was announced in 2006 that the band's second record, The Anatomy of the Tongue in Cheek, had reached the Gold rank as well as certified by the RIAA.

Shortly before Mmhmms release, longtime bassist Brian Pittman left the band, citing that he was tired of touring and wanted to start a landscaping company. He also joined Christian metal band Inhale Exhale shortly afterward. Matt Thiessen announced Pittman's departure in fall 2004, saying:
"After almost seven years of being in Relient K, our cherished and lifelong friend, Brian Pittman has decided to move on to other things. That IS crazy, huh? Brian decided to leave the band in July, so we've had plenty of time to let the initial shock die down. We're aware that a lot of you already knew, so we apologize for not announcing this sooner. There were many reasons. He thought long and hard about his decision, and he came to the conclusion that he would like to do other things than play bass for the band. We respect him for it. We'd be lying to say that we're not all completely bummed that Brian won't be a part of Relient K anymore. And though we know things won't be the same without him, it must be said that we have always valued our friendships with him more than our on-stage relationship.

"Anyway, all of us still hang out, and its like nothing is different at all. I feel like that's how you know that you've made a friend that will be there for the rest of your days. We want to thank Brian for all the years he gave the band. You're the best, buddy."

Pittman reunited with the band for one final show, which was the release party for "Mmhmm" at the Newport Music Hall in Columbus, Ohio on November 1, 2004. John Warne, lead singer and guitarist of Ace Troubleshooter, filled in as bassist for the remainder of 2004 and became full-time bassist in 2005. Also in 2005, Jon Schneck joined as a third guitarist, as well as a banjo and bell player, to create a fuller, more distinctive sound. This was also because the band planned to add more piano, and having another guitarist gave Matt Thiessen the freedom to do that.

Relient K provided the first track, "Manic Monday" originally recorded by The Bangles, to the various artist CD, Punk Goes 80's, released on June 7, 2005.

Mmhmm features two Top 40 hits which both made it on MTV's Top Ten. The music video for the track Be My Escape entered MTV's Top Ten, and landed them an appearance on The Tonight Show and Jimmy Kimmel Live!. "Be My Escape" is also featured on Now! 19, a popular secular and quasi-annual compilation series. It was classified as a gold single in October 2005. The music video for "Who I Am Hates Who I've Been" has also made its way onto the Total Request Live countdown, many top 40 radio stations, and was included on Now! 21.  Mmhmm was awarded a Dove Award in 2006 for the "Rock Album of the Year." The band was also nominated for "Artist of the Year" and "Band of the Year" at GMA Canada's 2006 Covenant Awards.

Five Score and Seven Years Ago (2006–2008) 

Recording sessions for another studio album, Five Score and Seven Years Ago, started on June 18, 2006 and continued for parts of July and August. Some tracks on the album were produced by Howard Benson, (The All-American Rejects, My Chemical Romance, P.O.D.). "Four score and seven years ago" is the first line of the Gettysburg Address, the famous speech delivered by Abraham Lincoln during the American Civil War. Thiessen had said that the title of the album comes from the fact that it's the band's fifth album, it is the first time all five of them are on a record together, and the band had been seven years since the release of Relient K.

While the band hoped for a November 2006 release, the official release date was announced as March 6, 2007. The album is considered, by the band, to be the group's happiest record to date.  On March 2, 2007 the entire album (except the last track, "Deathbed") was made available for streaming on the band's MySpace. Five Score and Seven Years Ago debuted at No. 6 on the Billboard 200 chart, selling about 64,000 copies in its first week.

The band's first single from the album, "Must Have Done Something Right," was released on the iTunes Store on November 28, 2006 and to radio on January 9, 2007. "Forgiven" was the first radio single directed at Christian stations.  "Forgiven" was the most added song on Christian radio and entered Billboards Hot Christian Songs chart on January 11, 2007. The single received enough airplay to be the fourth most played song on Christian Hit Radio (CHR) stations in 2007 according to R&R magazine.

The second single from the album, "The Best Thing," was released to radio on April 10, 2007, taking the 7th most adds in its first week. Thiessen has said that "The Best Thing" is "the anti-Daniel Powter "Bad Day" song.  It's straight-up positive." A video was filmed for the single. The second single released on Christian CHR radio stations was "Give Until There's Nothing Left", which was the 20th most played song on CHR radio stations in 2007.

In the early morning of June 28, 2007, Relient K's bus caught on fire from an oil spill from the engine. Everyone escaped safely, but the band lost many instruments, laptops, cameras, phones, iPods, clothes, and merchandise. Matt Thiessen said he lost a laptop that had roughly 100 unfinished songs on it, and Dave Douglas lost his Battlefield drum set. In the midst of it, the band still laughed at the situation, calling it "cinematic". On a blog post on the band's website, Matt Thiessen stated that the next day after the fire, the band members went to view the damage of their van and found that while 85% of their gear was intact, Douglas's drum kit set was not salvageable. A member of the Switchfoot forums first announced it, asking everyone to pray for the band. The band had just played Creation Northeast, and had to cancel its scheduled appearance at Cornerstone Festival in Illinois. The group did, however, play its next scheduled show in Greeley, CO on June 30, 2007. In the months following, the band played more Christian rock festivals.

The band released Let It Snow, Baby... Let It Reindeer, a Christmas album, on October 23, 2007. The CD contained all of the tracks from Deck the Halls, Bruise Your Hand as well as six new songs. This Christmas themed re-release was met with a peak of No. 96 on the Billboard 200.

Relient K, Switchfoot and Ruth recorded a song together, "Rebuild". It is available for download on Switchfoot's website; fans can choose between paying for the song (with proceeds going to Habitat for Humanity) or downloading it for free.

On October 18, 2007 drummer Dave Douglas announced his departure on good terms on the band's website due to a desire to pursue his side-project Gypsy Parade with his wife Rachel. He played his last show with Relient K on December 29, 2007. On February 12, 2008 it was announced that Ethan Luck, former guitarist of The O.C. Supertones and for Demon Hunter, would be replacing Douglas as the band's new drummer.

Luck and Warne were in a short-lived band together called Guerilla Rodeo.

"The Pirates Who Don't Do Anything" which was originally recorded for Jonah: A VeggieTales Movie, was also used in The Pirates Who Don't Do Anything: A VeggieTales Movie.

 The Bird and the Bee Sides (2008) 

On July 1, 2008 Relient K released a double EP. The double EP is contained on a single disc and contains The Nashville Tennis EP and The Bird and the Bee Sides. The Nashville Tennis EP included 13 tracks of new material that allowed the band to explore its sound a bit by allowing other band members, besides Thiessen and Hoopes, to compose/record a few tracks, as well as adding some influences from country and ska music. The Bird and the Bee Sides contained tracks that had previously been released on hard-to-come-by records.  The Bird and the Bee Sides won the 2009 GMA Canada Covenant Award for Modern Rock/Alternative Album of the Year.  In turning in the EP, Relient K officially fulfilled its contract with Gotee Records and subsequently signed to and now manage Mono vs Stereo (an imprint of Gotee Records).

In November 2008, the band released three bonus iTunes tracks for a re-issue of Let It Snow, Baby... Let It Reindeer.  The tracks were later pulled from iTunes, but have since then been released on Gotee Records's 2010 Christmas compilation album: Tis The Season To Be Gotee.

Forget and Not Slow Down (2009–2010) 

In early 2009, the band began to write music for an album to be released later in 2009. Thiessen stated that the band had been keen on finishing the album for a 2009 release and had begun recording the new album with the band's "favorite" producer, Mark Lee Townsend at Dark Horse Recording Studio in Tennessee. After recording a few tracks, the band stated that more tracks were set to be recorded with John Feldmann. Webisodes released weekly via the band's MySpace and Facebook pages show the recording progress in the studio. On May 8, 2009, Thiessen announced on Twitter the album's title, Forget and Not Slow Down, also noting that 'Forget and Not Slow Down' is the name of a track.

Forget and Not Slow Down was available for pre-order, with the option of having a faux VIP-Pass signed by members of the band, and T-shirt, and a poster featuring the names of all who pre-ordered the album. On September 29, the album was made available for stream off of AbsolutePunk. It was released on October 6, 2009.

A bonus song was offered to customers who bought the album from Amazon.com's MP3 store. The song is entitled "Terminals" and was produced by Owl City's Adam Young.  The song is now available for download without purchasing the full album.

In May 2010, Relient K released a triple-compilation collection CD entitled The First Three Gears. It included the band's first three studio albums with various "EP exclusive" tracks attached to each CD, according to their approximate release year.

In October 2010, the band contributed an original song—"What Can I Do"—for Family Christian Stores' exclusive compilation album Freedom: Artists United for International Justice Mission, created in order to generate funds for International Justice Mission in fighting modern-day slavery.

Is for Karaoke (2011) 

On April 11, 2011, the band announced via Facebook that a cover album was set to be recorded. On June 14, 2011, Alt Press reported the EP would be called K Is for Karaoke and displayed the album artwork. The band revealed one album song per day on its Facebook page. The first album, Is for Karaoke EP, was made available for download on June 28, 2011 through the Amazon MP3 store. It was also available through iTunes or as a physical CD on the Vans Warped Tour and Rock The Universe at Universal Studios. On October 4, 2011 the group released a second EP, Is for Karaoke EP, Part 2, and also the full-length album, Is for Karaoke, which features all the tracks from both EPs.

Collapsible Lung, departure of Ethan Luck and Mmhmm 10th anniversary tour (2011–2014) 

In several interviews on YouTube, Matt Thiessen and other band members stated that they had planned to enter the studio in November 2011 to write and record an album, which they hoped would be released mid-2012. However, due to a record label swap, the album was delayed. RCA Music Group announced it was dissolving Jive Records along with Arista Records and J Records. With the shutdown, Relient K and all other artists previously signed to these three labels would release their future material on the RCA Records. In May 2012, it was announced via the band's Twitter that recording had begun with producer Paul Moak. On February 22, 2013, Absolutepunk.net posted that the new album was finished and that details were coming soon.

On February 4, 2013, the band released a single via YouTube, in the form of a lyric video: "That's My Jam". According to the group, the song was used in the background of a Pizza Hut commercial.  Later, the track was redone, featuring Owl City, as an iTunes bonus track for Collapsible Lung.

On March 30, the band announced at Easterfest that the new album would be called Collapsible Lung. The song "Don't Blink" was released in the form of a lyric video on the band's YouTube channel. On April 19, the band announced that the release of Collapsible Lung had been postponed to July 2013, and the specific date of July 2 was confirmed, along with the album cover artwork, on May 17.

On April 21, drummer Ethan Luck stated that he is no longer a member of the band. He became the on-tour guitar technician for the Cold War Kids. He and the Jo(h)ns had earlier posted that they would not be appearing on the next tour.

On May 29, the band released a second lyric video for the album via YouTube titled "Lost Boy". This was then followed on June 29, by a third lyric video for the title song "Collapsible Lung".

On July 2, 2013, Collapsible Lung was released as expected. The album charted well on many of Billboard's charts, most notably topping at number No. 16 on the Billboard 200.

In June 2014, the band contributed two cover songs to Gotee Records' twentieth anniversary album, Gotee Records: Twenty Years Brand New. The band performed a cover of "Body Be" by Johnny Q. Public, as well as a tenth anniversary version of the band's "Sadie Hawkins Dance".

In July 2014, the band announced a 10th anniversary "Mmhmm" tour slated from October 30 in Louisville to December 12 in Nashville. Shortly after the tour announcement, drummer Dave Douglas announced his return to the band for the 10th anniversary tour. Neither Jon Schneck nor John Warne joined the band on this tour.

Air for Free (2015–present) 

On September 30, 2015, long-time Relient K producer Mark Lee Townsend posted a short video on his Twitter account with the caption "RK 8 has been serious fun to make... you're gonna dig it. #rkjamsessions." The video showed Matt Thiessen, Matt Hoopes, and three other people in a studio recording a new song.

Thiessen stated in an interview in November 2015, "[Relient K has] a new record finished and poised for a 2016 release. At a show in December, the band revealed the album's title to be Air for Free.
On February 14, 2016, Relient K digitally released a new single titled "Look on Up". The song, however, was said by Matt Hoopes to not make it onto the new record. Although there were rumors that the album would be released in May, the band announced that the album would release on July 22, 2016. The album has 16 tracks, and is available digitally and on CD and vinyl.

A second single, "Bummin'", was released on April 13, 2016

On July 22, 2016 Air For Free was released. It debuted at No. 44 on the Billboard 200, No. 1 on Top Christian Albums, No. 6 on Top Rock Albums, and No. 3 on Top Alternative albums, selling 9,000 copies in its first week.

On October 27, 2016, Relient K digitally released The Creepier EP...er, a Halloween-themed EP.

Relient K toured alongside Switchfoot on the Looking For America tour from September 17, 2016 to November 26, 2016. Relient K announced that they would embark on a second tour with Switchfoot, the Still Looking For America 2our, which would cover Western U.S. and Canada, on January 21, 2017.

On February 12, 2017, Relient K digitally released a Valentine's Day EP titled Truly, Madly, Deeply EP.

On April 24, 2020, they released Relient K: Live, which combined live tracks from a 2009 show at Rocketown in Nashville, Tennessee and a 2016 show at The Ritz in Raleigh, North Carolina. The songs were previously only available on vinyl.

On February 17, 2022 Relient K kicked off their "Um Yeah Tour" at The Pageant in St. Louis, Missouri and ended the tour on April 2, 2022 after two shows in Nashville, TN. Jon Schneck (guitar, vocals), Dave Douglas (drums, vocals) and Ethan Luck (bass, vocals) returned to the band's lineup for the tour, alongside Matt Thiessen (guitar, piano, leading vocals) and Matt Hoopes (guitar, vocals). In a podcast interview, Jon Schneck said the band was trying to schedule a west coast leg of the tour for the fall of 2022, since no cities or states west of Missouri were included in the initial run. The "Um Yeah tour" itself was deemed highly successful as many shows sold out and lines to attend wrapped around the buildings they performed in.

Band members 

Current members

 Matt Hoopes – lead guitar, backing vocals (1998–present)
 Matt Thiessen – lead vocals, piano, rhythm guitar, occasional trumpet (1998–present)
 Dave Douglas – drums, backing vocals, additional vocals (2000–2007, 2022–present; 2014–2022 as touring/session member)
 Jon Schneck – rhythm and lead guitar, banjo, mandolin, bells, backing vocals (2005–2015, 2022–present)
 Ethan Luck – bass (2022–present), drums (2007–2013), backing vocals (2007–2013, 2022–present)

Former members

 Brian Pittman – bass (1998–2004)
 Todd Frascone – drums (1998)
 Stephen Cushman – drums, backing vocals (1998–2000)
 Brett Schoneman – drums (2000)
 Jared Byers – drums (2000)
 John Warne – bass, backing vocals (2004–2013)
 Tom Breyfogle – bass, backing vocals (2014–2017), drums (2013–2014)
 Josh Sudduth – rhythm and lead guitar, backing vocals (2014–2017)
Jake Germany – keyboard, backing vocals (2017)

Former touring musicians

 Dan Gartley – bass, backing vocals (2004, 2013)
 Justin York – guitar, backing vocals (2010–2011)
 Jeremy Gifford - bass, backing vocals (2013)
 Zac Farro – drums (2013)
 Mark Lee Townsend – guitar, backing vocals (2016)

Timeline

Tours and live performances

Other projects

The Complex Infrastructure Known as the Female Mind 

In 2004, Relient K released a book, The Complex Infrastructure Known as the Female Mind. Though the band is listed as the author of the book, the band members contributed very little to the content of the book. The book clues in the confused male Relient K fans on the thoughts of female fans, and clues in the confused female Relient K fans on some of the thoughts of males. The band gives advice on the opposite sex through personal experience, stereotypes (including The Rock Chick and Vanilla Pudding), and Biblical advice—presented in the attitude found in the group's music. The title of the book is taken from the last line of the song "Mood Rings," which is found on the band's third album, Two Lefts Don't Make a Right...but Three Do.

Woodland Forest 

In June 2006, Relient K released the first episode of the group's own flash cartoon. The cartoon features all five band members, and takes place in a fictional land known as Woodland Forest. It is animated by bassist John Warne. There have only been two episodes thus far, and can be found on YouTube. The cartoons also feature "Merle the Squirrel," singing the Woodland Forest theme song, as well as "Crosby the Reindeer," singing O Holy Night.

Podcasts 

Relient K has made a total of nine audio podcasts and eleven video podcasts. The nine audio podcasts were made during the band's time on the Matt Hoopes Birthday Tour. The band included interviews with the band members, the group's guitar technicians, and along with others involved in the group's touring. There were also interviews with the other touring bands, The Rocket Summer and Maxeen.

The five video podcasts include various scenes in the studio, as well as the band doing things outside the studio, much like the video podcasts made by Switchfoot. The first two video podcasts showed the band in the studio preparing for the recording of Five Score and Seven Years Ago, and Dave Douglas recording the drum parts, respectively. The third video podcast was a collection of footage and discussions from the Nintendo Fusion Tour, and a Mario Kart DS Tournament between the five band members. The fourth video podcast showed Jon Schneck and Dave Douglas preparing for a boxing match (which is also included and completed in the Wal-Mart "Devastation and Reform" video), and the fifth video podcast showed the completion of the battle. There is a sixth unreleased video podcast including John Warne fulfilling his lifelong dream of walking into a room with the AutoZone Theme Song playing. It shows Warne recording the song with the assistance of Dave Douglas and Jon Schneck. It can be found on YouTube at the present time, and it is currently unofficially released on the site, as it has not made it to the band's official site. The eighth video podcast is about the band going to see millions of bats fly at sundown. The last podcast is a short video showing the band playing a game called "Gum Golf" created during the release of Let it Snow, Baby... Let it Reindeer.

Related projects 

Outside of Relient K, Matt Thiessen has a piano-focused solo project called Matthew Thiessen and the Earthquakes. He started it in 1998, around the time Relient K was started. He released a full album, "Wind Up Bird", under the project in 2018.

The band made a cover of the song, "The Pirates Who Don't Do Anything" for the soundtrack to the movie Jonah: A VeggieTales Movie. It was also featured in the movie adaptation of the song.

Former drummer Dave Douglas created a project called Agnes, a solo rock project that somewhat resembles the sound of Relient K's earlier music with his own twist. Douglas also started a project called Gypsy Parade, a softer project that he started with his wife, Rachel. They have released two demo songs on their MySpace with more expected.  Douglas amicably left Relient K to further pursue this project. Gypsy Parade has since disbanded, Attack Cat taking its place.

Ethan Luck, the former drummer, was involved with the Christian metal band Demon Hunter until late 2009, but he also has a side project called My Red Hot Nightmare which included drummer Josh Abbott, who was the drummer for Bassist John Warne's band, Ace Troubleshooter for the band's entire existence. Luck also played guitar in the Christian Ska band The O.C. Supertones and is featured on a few of the band's albums, including Loud and Clear and Live! Volume One.

Three tracks were featured on the compilation album My Other Band, Vol. 1 on Mono vs Stereo records in 2006, from Matt Thiessen's side project Matthew Thiessen and the Earthquakes, Dave Douglas' side project Agnes, and Ethan Luck's My Red Hot Nightmare project. Relient K was part of a fundraiser called "Habitat for Humanity" with other Christian bands. Matt Thiessen and Jon Foreman (Switchfoot's lead singer and guitarist) wrote a song called "Rebuild" to help raise even more money.

In 2011, John Warne became a member of Yellow Second.

Matt Thiessen co-wrote the song "Longshot" along with Katy Perry for Kelly Clarkson's CD, All I Ever Wanted.

Philanthropy 

Relient K starred in the educational drug abuse prevention film, "Natural High 4". The band members provided advice to young adults to stay off of drugs and to pursue their personal best.

Discography

Studio albums 

 Relient K (2000)
 The Anatomy of the Tongue in Cheek (2001)
 Two Lefts Don't Make a Right...but Three Do (2003)
  Deck the Halls, Bruise Your Hand (2003)
 Mmhmm (2004)
 Five Score and Seven Years Ago (2007)
 Let It Snow, Baby... Let It Reindeer (2007)

 Forget and Not Slow Down (2009)
 Is for Karaoke (2011)
 Collapsible Lung (2013)
 Air for Free (2016)

References

External links 

 

 
1998 establishments in Ohio
Alternative rock groups from Ohio
Pop punk groups from Ohio
Capitol Records artists
Christian punk groups
Christian rock groups from Ohio
Culture of Canton, Ohio
Gotee Records artists
Grammy Award winners
Musical groups established in 1998
Musical quartets
Musical quintets
RCA Records artists